, also known as Regarding Reincarnated to Slime and short name , is a Japanese fantasy light novel series written by , and illustrated by Mitz Vah. The story is about a salaryman who is murdered and reincarnates in a sword and sorcery world as a slime with unique powers and gathers allies to build his own nation of monsters.

It was serialized online from 2013 to 2016 on the user-generated novel publishing website Shōsetsuka ni Narō. It was later acquired by Micro Magazine, which published the first light novel volume in 2014. Twenty volumes have been released as of September 2022. The light novel has been licensed in North America by Yen Press, who published the first volume in December 2017. It has received a manga adaptation published by Kodansha along with five manga spin-offs published, respectively, by Micro Magazine and Kodansha and an anime television series adaptation produced by Eight Bit, which aired from October 2018 to March 2019. A second season of the anime series aired from January to September 2021, and an anime adaptation of the second spin-off manga aired from April to June 2021. An anime film was released in November 2022. A three-episode original net animation spin-off titled Coleus no Yume is set to premiere in Q4 2023. A third season is set to premiere in Q2 2024.

Plot

Satoru Mikami is an ordinary 37-year-old corporate worker living in Tokyo. He is almost content with his monotonous life, despite the fact that he doesn't have a girlfriend. During a casual encounter with his colleague, an assailant pops out of nowhere and stabs him. While succumbing to his injuries, a mysterious voice echoes in his mind and recites a series of commands of which he could not make sense.

After regaining consciousness, Satoru discovers that he has been reincarnated as a Slime in an unfamiliar world. At the same time, he also acquires new-found skills, particularly the ability called "Predator," which allows him to devour anything and mimic its appearance and skills. He stumbles upon Veldora, a powerful 'Storm Dragon', who has been sealed for the last 300 years for reducing a town to ashes. Feeling sorry for him, Satoru befriends the dragon, promising to help him in destroying the seal. They decide to exchange names, Veldora bestows upon him name Rimuru, and receives name Tempest in return. Slime then consumes the dragon together with his prison in order to analyze the spell inside itself and eventually free Veldora.

The disappearance of Veldora's aura creates a power vacuum which eventually makes Rimuru the leader of all beings inhabiting the Great Forest of Jura, who accept him as a ruler and together they found the nation of Tempest. With Rimuru's strength, wisdom and idealistic vision the new nation quickly grows in strength and influence. Soon Rimuru and his subjects draw the attention of the nearby foreign powers, from monarchs and legendary heroes to demon lords, some seeking to become their allies, while others intending to take advantage of or destroy them completely.

Media

Light novels

Fuse originally serialized the series as a web novel on the user-generated content site Shōsetsuka ni Narō between February 20, 2013, and January 1, 2016. The series was acquired for print publication by Micro Magazine, who published the first light novel, with illustrations by Mitz Vah, under their GC Novels in May 2014. On April 15, 2017, English publisher Yen Press announced during their panel at Sakura-Con that they had licensed the series for release in North America.

A spin-off web novel series set between the ninth and tenth volumes of the light novel, titled Toaru Kyūka no Sigoshi-kata, began serialization on Shōsetsuka ni Narō on February 20, 2023.

Manga

Taiki Kawakami launched a manga adaptation in Kodansha's shōnen manga magazine Monthly Shōnen Sirius on March 26, 2015. Kodansha USA announced their license to the manga during their panel at New York Comic Con on October 6, 2016.

A spin-off manga, titled , with art by Shō Okagiri, has been serialized on Micro Magazine's Comic Ride website since July 28, 2016.

A second spin-off manga, titled , with art by Shiba, has been serialized in Kodansha's shōnen manga magazine Monthly Shōnen Sirius since March 2018, compiled into five volumes as of March 2021, and licensed in English by Kodansha USA.

A third spin-off manga, titled  and illustrated by Shizuku Akechi began serialization in Kodansha's Niconico-based Suiyōbi no Sirius manga web platform on September 26, 2018, and has been compiled into one volume as of July 9, 2019. On June 3, 2020, Kodansha USA announced that it has licensed That Time I Got Reincarnated (Again!) as a Workaholic Slime.

A fourth spin-off manga, titled , with art by Tae Tono began serialization in Suiyōbi no Sirius on March 14, 2019. On March 18, 2020, Kodansha USA announced their license to the manga for a print release under the title That Time I Got Reincarnated as a Slime: Trinity in Tempest.

A fifth spin-off titled , with art by Chacha, began serialization in Monthly Shōnen Sirius in 2019. This story differs from the main one after Rimuru's encounter with Shizu, when he learns how to mimic a human body. However, the body he creates is that of a three-year-old.

A sixth spin-off manga centered around Demon Lord Clayman, titled  (That Time I Got Reincarnated as a Slime: Clayman's Revenge), with art by Wataru Kajika began serialization in Monthly Shōnen Sirius on April 26, 2022.

A manga adaptation of the Toaru Kyūka no Sigoshi-kata web novel has been announced. It is set to be serialized in Monthly Shōnen Sirius and be illustrated by Yuzo Takada.

Anime

An anime television series adaptation aired from October 2, 2018, to March 19, 2019, on Tokyo MX and other channels. The series is animated by Eight Bit and directed by Yasuhito Kikuchi, with Atsushi Nakayama as assistant director, Kazuyuki Fudeyasu handling series composition, Ryouma Ebata designing the characters, and Takahiro Kishida providing monster designs. Elements Garden is composing the series' music. The first opening theme is "Nameless story" performed by Takuma Terashima, while the first ending theme is "Another colony" performed by True. The second opening theme is  performed by Terashima, while the second ending theme is  performed by Azusa Tadokoro. The series is simulcast by Crunchyroll with Funimation streaming an English dub as it airs. The first season ran for 24 episodes. An original animation DVD was originally scheduled to be released on March 29, 2019, bundled with the 11th manga volume, but it was delayed to December 4, 2019, bundled with the 13th manga volume. A second original animation DVD was released on July 9, 2019, bundled with the 12th manga volume. Three more original animation DVDs have been announced, with the third OAD being released on March 27, 2020, bundled with the 14th manga volume. The fourth OAD is being bundled with the 15th manga volume, which released on July 9, 2020. The fifth OAD was to be bundled with 16th manga volume, which released on November 9, 2020.

A second season was announced to be a split-season anime, but the first half was delayed from October 2020 to January 2021, and the second half was delayed from April to July 2021 from due to the effects of the COVID-19 pandemic in Japan.  The first half aired from January 12 to March 30, 2021, and the second half aired from July 6 to September 21, 2021. Eight Bit animated the series, with the staff and cast members reprising their roles.  The opening theme is "Storyteller" performed by True, while the ending theme is "STORYSEEKER" performed by STEREO DIVE FOUNDATION.  The second opening theme is "Like Flames" performed by MindaRyn, while the second ending theme is "Reincarnate" performed by Takuma Terashima.

A spin-off anime series based on the Slime Diaries: That Time I Got Reincarnated as a Slime manga was scheduled to premiere in January 2021 but had been delayed to April 2021 due to COVID-19. 
The series aired from April 6 to June 22, 2021. Eight Bit also animated the series, with Yuji Haibara directing the series, Kotatsumikan writing the script, Risa Takai and Atsushi Irie as character designers, and R.O.N composing the music.  The opening theme is "Brand new diary" performed by Akane Kumada.

After the airing of the second season's final episode, it was announced that the series is receiving an anime film, titled That Time I Got Reincarnated as a Slime the Movie: Scarlet Bond. The film premiered in Japan on November 25, 2022. Crunchyroll will screen the film outside of Asia in early 2023.

A third season was announced on November 9, 2022. It is set to premiere in Q2 2024.

A three-episode original net animation (ONA) series, titled Coleus no Yume, was announced on February 19, 2023, and will premiere in Q4 2023.

Video game
At the AnimeJapan 2021 special stage for the franchise, a free-to-play role-playing game app, titled Tensei Shitara Slime Datta Ken: Maō to Ryū no Kenkoku-tan (That Time I Got Reincarnated as a Slime: The Saga of How the Demon Lord and Dragon Founded a Nation), was announced. It is developed by Bandai Namco Entertainment and will be released in 2021. The game was released in English under the title That Time I Got Reincarnated as a Slime: ISEKAI Memories.

The mobile game The Seven Deadly Sins: Grand Cross had a crossover event where some of the characters of the series could be obtained for a limited time.

Reception
The light novel series has over 4.5 million volumes in print. It was the fifth best-selling title of 2018 with 539,277 and its manga adaptation was the ninth best-selling title of 2018 with 3,460,066 copies. It also became the first manga series based on a light novel with at least 20 million total copies in print. By March 2021, it had over 24 million copies in circulation. In May 2021 it reached 25 million. In January 2022, it had over 30 million copies in circulation. In February 2023, it had 40 million copies in circulation, with 35 million copies in Japan and 5 million copies overseas.

The light novel ranked eighth in 2017 in Takarajimasha's annual light novel guide book Kono Light Novel ga Sugoi!, in the tankōbon category. It ranked sixth in 2018 and fifth in 2019.

In 2019, Rimuru Tempest won Best Protagonist on the Crunchyroll Anime Awards.

The manga adaptation was nominated for the 45th Kodansha Manga Award in the shōnen category in 2021; it won the 46th edition in the same category in 2022.

In May 2021, That Time I Got Reincarnated as a Slime was one of five isekai-oriented anime titles (along with KonoSuba, Zombie Land Saga, Princess Lover!, and Nekopara) that were given a limited ban by the Russian government for their depiction of reincarnation.

Awards 
The manga adaptation has won the 2018 BookWalker Award. The light novel and anime have also received recognitions.

In 2022, it won as "Best Fantasy" in Crunchyroll Anime Awards 2022.

See also
Alderamin on the Sky - Another light novel series whose manga adaptation was illustrated by Taiki Kawakami

Notes

References

External links
  at Shōsetsuka ni Narō 
  
  
  
  
 

2014 Japanese novels
2018 anime television series debuts
2021 anime television series debuts
2023 anime ONAs
Anime and manga based on light novels
Book series introduced in 2013
Crunchyroll Anime Awards winners
Eight Bit (studio)
Fiction about reincarnation
Funimation
Isekai anime and manga
Isekai novels and light novels
Japanese webcomics
Kodansha manga
Light novels
Light novels first published online
Muse Communication
Parallel universes in fiction
Novels about reincarnation
Seinen manga
Shōnen manga
Shōsetsuka ni Narō
Upcoming anime television series
Vertical (publisher) titles
Webcomics in print
Winner of Kodansha Manga Award (Shōnen)
Works banned in Russia
Yen Press titles